Colonel George Robert Canning Harris, 4th Baron Harris,  (3 February 1851 – 24 March 1932), generally known as Lord Harris, was a British colonial administrator and Governor of Bombay. He was also an English amateur cricketer, mainly active from 1870 to 1889, who played for Kent and England as captain of both teams. He had a political career from 1885 to 1900 and was for much of his life a highly influential figure in cricket administration through the offices he held with Marylebone Cricket Club (MCC). He was President of the Kent County Football Association between 1881 and 1908.

Early life
The Honourable George Harris was born in St Ann's, Trinidad on 3 February 1851 when his father, George Harris, 3rd Baron Harris, was serving as Governor of Trinidad (1846–1854) and Sarah ( Cummins). Harris barely knew his mother who died when he was two years old. In 1854, the family moved to Madras when his father was posted to the governorship there. Harris senior retired in March 1859 and returned to England, where he became involved with Kent County Cricket Club as a committee member and, in 1870, club president.

In 1864, at the age of 13, Harris was sent to Eton College to further his education. His first important cricket match was the 1868 Eton versus Harrow fixture at Lord's, when he was seventeen; he scored 23 and 6. In the same fixture the following year, when Cuthbert Ottaway scored 108 to seal victory for Eton by an innings and nineteen runs, Harris was out for 0. In 1870, his last year at Eton, he scored 12 and 7 against Harrow. He also studied at Christ Church, Oxford.

His father died in November 1872, whereupon Harris junior succeeded to the barony as 4th Baron Harris. He was already a first-class cricketer by then and was henceforward universally known in the sport as Lord Harris.

Cricket career

Summary of playing career
Harris made his first-class debut for Kent in 1870 after he left Eton. Owing to his position in society, he was immediately elected to the club committee and was associated with Kent cricket for the rest of his life. He went up to Christ Church, Oxford in September 1870 and played for the Oxford University team from 1871 to 1874. He was available to play for Kent in the latter half of each of these seasons and became county captain in succession to South Norton in 1871, although his appointment was not made official until after he left Oxford. Harris held the Kent captaincy until 1889.

He led the English cricket team in Australia and New Zealand in 1878–79 and was a central figure in the events of 8 February 1879 when a crowd riot erupted at a match in Sydney. The team had previously played a match against an All-Australia XI at the Melbourne Cricket Ground and this was later designated Test status as the third-ever Test match. Harris was therefore the second England Test captain after James Lillywhite. Australia, led by Dave Gregory, won the match by 10 wickets.

Harris captained England against Australia on three further occasions. In 1880 at The Oval, in what was later recognised as the inaugural Test match in England, England won by 5 wickets. Harris captained England in two of the Tests played in 1884, his team winning by an innings and 5 runs at Lord's  and drawing the final match in the series at The Oval.

The full span of Harris' first-class cricket career was from 1870 to 1911, at 42 seasons one of the longest on record, though he made only seven appearances after 1889 when he relinquished the Kent captaincy so his essential playing career was from 1870 to 1889. He appeared in 224 first-class matches, including four Test matches, as a righthanded batsman who bowled right arm fast with a roundarm action. He scored 9,990 runs in first-class cricket with a highest score of 176 among eleven centuries and held 190 catches. He took 75 wickets with a best analysis of five for 57. Even in old age he was a capable  cricketer, scoring a fifty for I Zingari v West Kent in his 71st year and 25 against Philadelphia Pilgrims at Lord's, 53 years after he had made his first appearance at the home of cricket.

Throwing issue
In the early 1880s, there were a number of bowlers who were widely considered to have unfair actions, with the Lancashire pair of Jack Crossland and George Nash coming in for particular criticism. After playing for Kent against Lancashire in 1885, when he faced the bowling of Crossland and Nash, Harris decided to take action. He persuaded the Kent committee to cancel the return fixture. Later that season, Crossland was found to have broken his residential qualification for Lancashire by living in Nottinghamshire, and Nash dropped out of the side. The two counties resumed playing each other the following season. Harris's Wisden obituarist wrote: "...there can be no doubt the action of Lord Harris, even if it did not entirely remove the throwing evil, had a very healthy effect on the game."

Administration

Harris had a long association with Lord's and MCC as both player and administrator. In 1862, aged eleven, he was practising at Lord's. It was not till 1929, at the age of 78, that he played there for the last time, representing MCC v Indian Gymkhana. He was president of MCC in 1895, a trustee from 1906 to 1916 and treasurer from 1916 to 1932. Additionally, he was at various times chairman of both the MCC finance and cricket sub-committees. Through these offices, Harris wielded considerable power in the world of cricket and it was written of him: "No man has exercised so strong an influence on the cricket world so long..."

In July 1909, Harris chaired a meeting of representatives of England, Australia and South Africa which launched the Imperial Cricket Conference and agreed rules to control Test cricket between the three nations. In 1926, he presided at a meeting at The Oval, when it was agreed that "governing bodies of cricket in countries within the Empire to which cricket teams are sent, or which send teams to England" should be eligible for ICC membership. The meeting had the effect of creating three new Test-playing nations: West Indies, New Zealand and India.

Harris was a controversial figure in the world of cricket, revered by cricket's MCC-based establishment and heavily criticised elsewhere. Not all thought that he used his power well. Alan Gibson once wrote that he was "an antediluvian old tyrant", though he later retracted this, saying that Harris was a more complex figure than that. But, complex or not, Harris was never accused by contemporaries of being an intellectual. He might have robbed England of the services of one of its greatest batsmen, Wally Hammond, who had been born in Kent but chose to play for Gloucestershire, where he had gone to school. Hammond had not fulfilled the required period of residence to qualify for Gloucestershire and, once Harris became aware of this, Hammond was barred from playing for them until the necessary time had elapsed. The affair resulted in Harris complaining about what he called "bolshevism" influencing cricket.

Political and military career

Harris was politically active as a member of the Conservative Party, serving in the House of Lords as Under-Secretary of State for India from 25 June 1885, then as Parliamentary Under-Secretary of State for War from 4 August 1886 to 1890. He was appointed Governor of the Presidency of Bombay in British India from 1890 to 1895. Harris had also been involved with the British military, starting in the Royal East Kent Regiment; and becoming colonel in the regiment; and joining the Imperial Yeomanry, 1900–01. He went on to work as Under-Secretary of State for War, 1886–90; then vice-lieutenant for Kent. He was in charge of the Sovereign's Sceptre with dove at the coronation Coronation of Edward VII and Alexandra.

Bombay
His governorship of Bombay was not without extensive criticism, with one anonymous writer penning a poem expressing the hope that Bombay would not suffer too greatly from Harris' political inexperience. He was mainly notable for his enthusiastic pursuit of cricket amongst his fellow Europeans in the colony, at the expense of connecting with the native population. When the interracial Bombay riots of 1893 broke out, Harris was out of the city at Poona enjoying cricket matches. He returned to Bombay only on the ninth day of rioting, and then primarily to attend a cricket match there. Many later writers credited Harris with almost single-handedly introducing and developing the sport in India. The game was, however, well established among the natives before his arrival. Furthermore, in 1890, he rejected a petition signed by over 1,000 locals to relocate European polo players to another ground so that the locals could use the area for cricket matches. It was only in 1892 that he granted a parcel of land to the newly formed Muslim Gymkhana for a cricket field, adjacent to land already used by the Parsee Gymkhana. His reluctance to do so is evident in his written comment:

I don't see how we can refuse these applicants; but I will steadfastly refuse any more grants once a Gymkhana has been established under respectable auspices by each nationality, and tell applicants that ground having been set apart for their nationality they are free to take advantage of it by joining that particular club.

When Harris left India, having virtually ignored famine, riots and sectarian unrest, a publisher circulated a collection of newspaper extracts from his time as governor. The introduction stated:

Never during the last hundred years has a Governor of Bombay been so sternly criticised and never has he met with such widespread unpopularity on account of his administration as Lord Harris.

Later career

On his return to England, Harris again served in the Conservative Government as a Lord in Waiting to Queen Victoria from 16 July 1895 to 4 December 1900.

He was appointed lieutenant-colonel in command of the Royal East Kent Yeomanry on 6 October 1897. During the Second Boer War, he held a commission as Assistant Adjutant-General for the Imperial Yeomanry from 28 February 1900, until he resigned in April 1901.

Death and family

Harris died in March 1932, aged 82.

In 1874, he married the Honourable Lucy Ada Jervis, daughter of Carnegie Robert John Jervis, 3rd Viscount St Vincent, and was succeeded in the barony by their son George Harris, 5th Baron Harris.

Arms

References

Further reading

External links

 
 

1851 births
1932 deaths
Barons in the Peerage of the United Kingdom
British sportsperson-politicians
Conservative Party (UK) Baronesses- and Lords-in-Waiting
England Test cricketers
English cricket administrators
England Test cricket captains
Free Foresters cricketers
English cricketers
Gentlemen cricketers
Gentlemen of England cricketers
Eldest sons of British hereditary barons
Governors of Bombay
I Zingari cricketers
Kent cricket captains
Kent cricketers
Knights Grand Commander of the Order of the Indian Empire
Knights Grand Commander of the Order of the Star of India
Marylebone Cricket Club cricketers
Oxford University cricketers
Alumni of Christ Church, Oxford
Presidents of Kent County Cricket Club
Presidents of the Marylebone Cricket Club
Oxford and Cambridge Universities cricketers
Members of the Bombay Legislative Council
North v South cricketers
Lord Londesborough's XI cricketers
Gentlemen of Kent cricketers
People educated at Eton College